Blanche Devereaux is a character from the sitcom television series The Golden Girls, and its spin-off The Golden Palace. Blanche was portrayed by Rue McClanahan for 8 years and 204 episodes across the two series. The character was inspired by Blanche DuBois (to whom Blanche Devereaux is compared in the pilot script) and Scarlett O'Hara.

McClanahan had previously co-starred with Beatrice Arthur in Maude and with Betty White in the first two seasons of Mama's Family. In pre-production, producers had planned for White (who was already well known for playing the man-hungry character  Sue Ann Nivens) to play Blanche, but neither White nor McClanahan wanted to be typecast, and the two roles were eventually switched by producers.

Family
Blanche Elizabeth Marie Hollingsworth grew up near Atlanta, Georgia, at her family's plantation, Twin Oaks. Her parents were the late Elizabeth-Ann Margaret Bennett (later seasons named her "Samantha Roquet") (Helen Kleeb) and Curtis "Big Daddy" Hollingsworth (first Murray Hamilton and, after Hamilton died, David Wayne), the latter a revered man in his neck of the woods. Much to young Blanche's dismay, her father married a young widow named Margaret Spencer (Sondra Currie) years after Blanche's mother died, but she begrudgingly accepted the marriage. As a young child, she had a mammy (nanny) named Viola Watkins (Ruby Dee) who took care of her before abruptly leaving one day. After her father's death, she learned that he and Viola had been secret lovers for many years and Viola left their family after Blanche's mother found out.

Blanche is a member of "the Alpha Gams" (Alpha Gamma Delta), but which university she attended is not known. On a few occasions, Blanche states that she is of the Baptist faith. She is proud of her status as a Southern debutante, but was shocked to learn, when tracing her family history, that she had a New York born Jewish great-grandmother which prevented her from joining the Daughters of the Old South.

Blanche is the third of five Hollingsworth children. Charmaine Hollingsworth (Barbara Babcock) is the spoiled oldest sister, who infuriated Blanche when she wrote a sordid novel Blanche thought was about her. When it was revealed that the book was about Charmaine and not Blanche, they made up and apologized to each other. The next youngest sibling is Blanche's brother Tad.

Blanche's sister Virginia Hollingsworth Warren (Sheree North), with whom Blanche shares a mutual loathing, is one year her junior. They buried the hatchet when Virginia went into kidney failure and Blanche offered her kidney to her sister. However, their relationship became strained once more after their argument following Big Daddy's death, in which Virginia accused Blanche of being too selfish and self-centered to say goodbye to her own father.

The fifth Hollingsworth child (by deduction) is Clayton Hollingsworth (Monte Markham), who appears in season four (1988) and season six (1991). When Clayton tells Blanche that he is gay, she struggles to accept his sexuality, but eventually does after Clayton intends to marry his boyfriend Doug.

Blanche also has a promiscuous niece named Lucy (Hallie Todd), who visits her during the first season.

Love life
Although notoriously man-hungry, Blanche was faithfully married for decades to her husband, George Devereaux. George died (in a car accident) in either 1981 or 1982, three or four years before the start of the series in 1985, and at some point earlier they had moved from Atlanta to Miami.

In a 1990 episode, Blanche dreamt that George came back from the dead nine years later (George told her he faked his death to escape criminal prosecution for fraud, for which he was framed by his own business partner). Actress Rue McClanahan has suggested that George was the love of Blanche's life, and that her promiscuity was in fact a desperate search for the next love of her life. 

During Blanche's senior year in high school, Christmas 1949, when she was 17, she almost eloped with Deck Boughvenlough, the father of her rival at cheerleading with the sole purpose of having the other girl taken off the squad. This establishes Blanche's year of birth as 1932.

Blanche is shown to have dated various men, some of them unsavory. She almost married a bigamist in the pilot episode before he was arrested. Another man stole her necklace at her full moon-leap year's party; he was also caught by the police. One boyfriend, Rex was emotionally and verbally abusive, until Dorothy helped Blanche realize his true personality. Another boyfriend, Gary (Jerry Hardin) cheated on her with Rose's sister Holly (Inga Swenson), who was visiting. Yet another, who appears in The Golden Palace, turns out to be a gigolo (Barry Bostwick). Blanche overcame her apprehension of dating Ted, who was in a wheelchair, only to find out he was married, so she terminated the relationship because she has never been the "other woman" in extramarital affairs and never wanted to be. The only other time that occurred was when her beau's wife was revived by paramedics after she was declared dead.

Blanche has also ruined good relationships with worthy men. Jake (Donnelly Rhodes) was perfect and wanted to marry her; he was charming and romantic, but Blanche found him a little 'rough around the edges' compared to the gentlemanly types she usually dated. She turned down his marriage proposal, to the disgust of her roommates, and regretted it later. When another beau, Steven (Robert Mandan), was hospitalized, she refused to visit him until much later, by which time he reconciled with his ex-girlfriend, Karen. Unlike Blanche, who feared commitment and having another man die on her, when Karen heard of Steven's illness, she went right to his side when he needed someone.

Blanche dated a blind man, John Quinn (Edward Winter) and considered breaking up with him because she knew he was not attracted to her physical beauty. She later apologized to him and made plans to see him again, but the relationship apparently ended, as he was never mentioned on the series again. Blanche's most frequent (but only seen once in season six) date was Mel Bushman (Alan King), who was always available whenever she lacked male companionship. The one time he was not, Blanche assumed he was dead and promptly fell in temporary love with him when she realized he was alive. Because of his zipper manufacturing business, Mel was known as "The Zipper King". When Blanche's death was reported mistakenly in a newspaper, Mel sent flowers and a note, saying he went back to his ex-wife.

Blanche is portrayed as promiscuous. In one episode, it is stated that her initials, Blanche Elizabeth Devereaux, spell out the word "BED". However, in a previous episode, Viola Watkins called her "Blanche Marie Hollingsworth". Blanche spends a great deal of her time with men, a source of condemnation from and amusement for her roommates. Blanche's seemingly liberated sexual behavior was in contrast to the sexual climate of the 1980s, when AIDS was beginning to seep into the nation's consciousness. However, in the episode "72 Hours", Blanche was cognizant of the dangers of HIV and STDs; she always used protection and knew every lover's sexual history. It was implied in one episode that she has had numerous interracial sexual liaisons with Black men, though no such relations were ever depicted on camera.

However, despite Blanche's alleged promiscuity, it was hinted that Blanche overly exaggerated many of her sexual encounters, telling Dorothy that telling tall tales was a tradition of the South.

In spite of her liberal attitude to sex, Blanche was actually conservative in many respects. She was a Republican, and she had a hard time accepting her brother Clayton being gay, especially when he visited her again with his partner Doug (Michael Ayr) whom he intended to marry (though Blanche eventually accepted this). In The Golden Palace episode “Camp Town Races Aren't Nearly as Much Fun as They Used to Be,” she hung up a Confederate battle flag and was unaware of the offence it caused to black people, including their hotel manager Roland (Don Cheadle) who viewed it as a symbol of racism, while Blanche saw it as a symbol of heritage and happy memories of growing up in the South.

Age
Throughout the course of the show, Blanche's precise age was never told. In the first-season episode "Blanche and the Younger Man" she admits that she is over fifty. During the Mother's Day episode, Blanche's mother says that she was 17 in 1949, placing her birth year in 1931 or 1932. In an episode later in the series, Rose successfully got all of Blanche's documentation, but when she sat down with the other girls to go over the information she had received, the age columns of all of papers said "Deleted by Authority of the Governor", implying Blanche had sex with the Governor to get her age struck from her record. In a 1993 episode of The Golden Palace, Blanche's brother, Tad, confirms to Rose that Blanche is in her early 60s.

In the first episode of season two, Blanche fears she is pregnant. She told the girls that she will be 65 when the baby is 18, therefore she would be 47 in season 2. However Sophia responds with “try 70” implying that Blanche's real age is 52.

In real life, Rue McClanahan was the youngest member of the show's cast (11 to 12 years younger than the other three series regulars).

Children and grandchildren
At various times over the course of the series, Blanche mentions the names of five children: Janet, Rebecca, Matthew "Skippy", Doug, and "Biff". However, in the third-season episode "Bringing Up Baby", when Dorothy questions an impulsive car purchase, Blanche says to her: "I have had four children, I have never had a Mercedes". She mentions three sons – Skippy, Biff, and Doug – in the episode "Bringing Up Baby", and Skippy's proper name (Matthew) was mentioned in the episode "To Catch a Neighbor"; that character appeared played by Texan comic Bill Engvall on an episode of The Golden Palace. During the series, Blanche learns that George also had a son named David (Mark Moses), as the result of an affair.

During the course of the show, Blanche is revealed not to have been very "hands-on" as a mother, as she frequently left her children to nannies and housekeepers. She had a strained relationship with both of her daughters, especially Janet, something that led to some of the most dramatic storylines, as she expressed regrets that she was not there for her children more, and it is loosely implied that she might have even been emotionally abusive to them when they were growing up. However, Blanche slowly rebuilt her relationships with Janet and Rebecca throughout the series. By the time the series ended, both Rebecca and Janet had healed their relationships with their mother.

Blanche's daughter, Rebecca, was seen most often on the show, although Blanche and she had frequent falling outs and bitter fights. When Rebecca was introduced, she was overweight and about to marry a verbally abusive man (Joe Regalbuto). Later in the series, they fought over a slimmed-down Rebecca's decision to be artificially inseminated and raising the baby without a father. Rebecca decided to visit a birthing center saying: "Hospitals have a rigid way of doing things." After hearing a frightening shriek, Rebecca changes her mind and lets her mother take her to a hospital and even lets her help with the labor in the delivery room, where Rebecca gave birth to her daughter Aurora. They then feuded again when Blanche's new suitor mistakened her for Aurora's mother and Blanche, who was actually babysitting, went along with it, which, upon the truth being revealed, caused Rebecca to accuse Blanche of using Aurora to "get a man". In each case, they eventually made up again, which was something Blanche seems not to have entirely done with Janet.

Blanche's youngest son Matthew "Skippy" appears in the Golden Palace, played by actor Bill Engvall. In the storyline, Blanche reluctantly supports him as he trades his career from stockbroker to a comedian. Blanche seems very protective of her youngest child, as when hilariously offering one of her sons to Dorothy in exchange for a Mercedes she says: "Which one do you want? Biff, Doug, Skippy? No, don't take Skippy. He has asthma."

Besides Aurora, Blanche has at least three other grandchildren: David, Melissa, and Sarah, all born to Janet, who married a "yankee". Blanche's 14 year-old grandson David visited the girls in the first season, but was unhappy and rebellious, due to problems in his home life. Sophia eventually hit him for being disrespectful. After David confided in Blanche, she told Janet that she wanted David to live with her, leading to a bitter falling out between mother and daughter.

Relationship with her roommates
Blanche acts as co-roommate and landlord to Rose Nylund, Dorothy Zbornak, and Sophia Petrillo. Throughout the series, Rose and she are often involved in the same activities. Though she, like Dorothy and Sophia, is annoyed at times by Rose's constant storytelling, she saw her as both her best friend and a surrogate sister. Blanche has her own collection of strange stories which she shares from time to time, often tales of her rivalry with sisters Virginia and Charmaine or of the promiscuous stunts she pulled as a teenager.

Her relationship with Dorothy is mixed with envy and condemnation and sisterhood on both parts: Dorothy envies and condemns Blanche's sexual comfortability, while Blanche envies Dorothy's intelligence and condemns her fashion sense, among other things. And yet, both Dorothy and she at times isolate themselves from Rose, ganging up on her when the latter said anything particularly foolish, and taking turns hitting her on the head with a newspaper or magazine. Their relationship is also symbiotic; in one of the last episodes in the series, Dorothy admitted that Blanche has helped her be comfortable with her own sexuality, while Dorothy herself has always served as Blanche's other voice of reason. Although Blanche is only a few years younger than Dorothy and Rose, she frequently brags about being the youngest roommate in the house.

Blanche considers Sophia as both a mother figure and as a mean old lady. Sophia considers Blanche as one of her own daughters, and very vocally, as a street prostitute. In the pilot episode, Sophia bluntly tells Blanche, "You look like a prostitute".

Significance
Rue McClanahan said playing the role of Blanche made her "one of the most recognizable women in the world", and resulted in her being named the "Fifth most beloved celebrity over 55" in the world. She said the fame of Blanche Devereaux, on television "week after week for decades", made McClanahan inseparable from Blanche in the public eye.

Blanche and the other three women were hailed as breakthrough television role models for older women, being attractive, stylishly dressed, and romantically active.

Additional appearances
Outside The Golden Girls and The Golden Palace, Blanche appears in the Empty Nest episode "Fatal Attraction" and the Nurses episode "Moon Over Miami".

Footnotes

References

The Golden Girls characters
Television characters introduced in 1985
Fictional characters from Georgia (U.S. state)
Fictional Republicans (United States)
Fictional hoteliers